Bruce Starkey (born 18 November 1953) is an Australian former rugby league footballer who played  who played in Sydney's NSWRFL competition in the 1970s and 1980s.

Career
A St. George junior from the Arncliffe Scots Club, Starkey went on to become a dual premiership winner with the St George Dragons. He was a powerful member of the St George forward pack in the victorious 1977 Grand Final and 1979 Grand Final teams that were coached by the legendary Harry Bath. He also played in the drawn 1977 Grand Final draw.  Starkey retired at the end of the 1982 season, and saw out his playing days at Cessnock, New South Wales.

Accolades
Starkey was awarded Life Membership of the St. George Dragons in 1993.

References

St. George Dragons players
1953 births
Australian rugby league players
Living people
Rugby league props
Rugby league players from Sydney
New South Wales rugby league team players